The Huntington Railroad was established on July 19, 1890 (although some sources claim it was in May, 1890) with a trolley line between Huntington Village and Halesite (now partially in the Village of Huntington Bay). It was eventually extended to Huntington Railroad Station, then along what is today mostly NY 110 through Melville, Farmingdale, and as far south as the docks of Amityville. Huntington Railroad had only one line throughout its history, although the length varied through the years.

Transit service is currently provided along the corridor by the S1 bus, operated by Suffolk County Transit.

History
The Huntington Railroad Company was chartered in May, 1890, and began operating on July 19, 1890 as a three-mile horsecar line between Halesite, New York through Downtown Huntington to Huntington Railroad Station. The Long Island Rail Road acquired control of this company on March 5, 1898, and transformed it into an electric trolley on June 17, 1898.

Control was transferred to an LIRR subsidiary called the Long Island Consolidated Electric Companies. The extension of the Huntington Railroad by the LICEC from Huntington to Amityville, was completed and put in operation on August 6, 1909. This line was 18.50 miles in length and reached from the harbor at Huntington to Great South Bay at Amityville, thus transformed Huntington Railroad into the only cross-island trolley on Long Island. Attempts to create other cross-island trolleys by the South Shore Traction Company and Suffolk Traction Company failed. Nassau County had trolleys that spanned the county, but they were never run by a single company.

From north to south the streets that the railroad ran along included Wincoma Drive, East Shore Drive, New York Avenue, Walt Whitman Road, Amityville Road, Broad Hollow Road, Conklin Street, Main Street (Farmingdale), Broadway, Sterling Place, Greene Street, Bennett Place, Richmond Avenue. Part of the right-of-way in Melville between Duryea Road and north of Old Country Road is today a realigned segment of NY 110. The former section is now known simply as Walt Whitman Road.

As a cross-island line, the Huntington Railroad served all three Long Island Rail Road stations in its vicinity: Huntington Station, Farmingdale Station and Amityville Station. A tower at Farmingdale Station was the sub-station for powering trolleys. Between Sterling Place and Greene Street in Amityville, another separate ROW leading to a bridge for trolleys over the Montauk Branch existed just along the west side of Amityville Station. In addition, Amityville Station also provided a connection to the Amityville Line of the Babylon Railroad, which was established in 1910, and lasted two years after the original line of the Babylon Railroad ceased to operate.

Trolley service began to decline at the end of World War I, due to the cost of the war and the rise in the use of automobiles. Therefore, the LIRR prepared to remove involvement with trolleys. Huntington Railroad service ended on September 23, 1919, however, that was not the end of trolleys in western Suffolk County.

Huntington Traction Company
The Huntington Traction Company was the successor to the Huntington Railroad Company, inheriting the original line between Huntington Railroad Station and Halesite. The company ran the line only as far south as Jericho Turnpike in South Huntington, and used the same wires from the Huntington Railroad. Huntington Traction Company only used Wincoma Drive, East Shore Drive, New York Avenue, and Walt Whitman Road along its route. With the increasing use of buses, Huntington Traction couldn't compete either. The line was finally abandoned in 1927.

References

External links

Huntington Traction Company; 1920-1927 (Arrt's Arrchives)
Huntington Railroad (Unofficial LIRR History Website)

Streetcar lines on Long Island
Railway companies established in 1890
Railway companies disestablished in 1919
Defunct New York (state) railroads
Defunct public transport operators in the United States
Companies affiliated with the Long Island Rail Road
Transportation in Suffolk County, New York
Transportation in Nassau County, New York
1890 establishments in New York (state)
American companies established in 1890
1919 disestablishments in New York (state)